Christian Stengel (1902–1986) was a French film director and screenwriter. Originally a bank clerk, he entered films in 1933 when he wrote his first screenplay.

Selected filmography
 Crime and Punishment (1935)
 The Former Mattia Pascal (1937)
 Beethoven's Great Love (1937)
 The Man from Nowhere (1937)
 Alone in the Night (1945)
 The Lost Village (1947)
 Dreams of Love (1947)
 Rome Express (1950)
 No Pity for Women (1950)

References

Bibliography
 Rège, Philippe. Encyclopedia of French Film Directors, Volume 1. Scarecrow Press, 2009.

External links

1902 births
1986 deaths
French film directors
French male screenwriters
20th-century French screenwriters
20th-century French male writers